The 2004 Checker Auto Parts 500 was the 34th stock car race of the 2004 NASCAR Nextel Cup Series season, the eighth race of the 2004 Chase for the Nextel Cup, and the 17th iteration of the event. The race was held on Sunday, November 7, 2004, before a crowd of 105,000 in Avondale, Arizona at Phoenix International Raceway, a 1-mile (1.6 km) permanent low-banked tri-oval race track. The race was extended from its scheduled 312 laps to 315 due to a green–white–checker finish. On the final restart, Dale Earnhardt, Inc. driver Dale Earnhardt Jr. would hold off the field on the final restart to win his 15th career NASCAR Nextel Cup Series win and his sixth and final win of the season. To fill out the podium, Ryan Newman of Penske-Jasper Racing and Jeff Gordon of Hendrick Motorsports would finish second and third, respectively.

Background 

Phoenix International Raceway – also known as PIR – is a one-mile, low-banked tri-oval race track located in Avondale, Arizona. It is named after the nearby metropolitan area of Phoenix. The motorsport track opened in 1964 and currently hosts two NASCAR race weekends annually. PIR has also hosted the IndyCar Series, CART, USAC and the Rolex Sports Car Series. The raceway is currently owned and operated by International Speedway Corporation.

The raceway was originally constructed with a 2.5 mi (4.0 km) road course that ran both inside and outside of the main tri-oval. In 1991 the track was reconfigured with the current 1.51 mi (2.43 km) interior layout. PIR has an estimated grandstand seating capacity of around 67,000. Lights were installed around the track in 2004 following the addition of a second annual NASCAR race weekend.

Entry list

Practice

First practice 
The first practice session was held on Friday, November 5, at 9:20 AM PST, and would last for two hours.

Second practice 
The second practice session was held on Saturday, November 6, at 8:30 AM PST, and would last for 45 minutes.

Third and final practice 
The third and final practice session, sometimes referred to as Happy Hour, was held on Saturday, November 6, at 10:10 AM PST, and would last for 45 minutes.

Qualifying 
Qualifying was held on Friday, November 5, at 1:10 PM PST. Each driver would have two laps to set a fastest time; the fastest of the two would count as their official qualifying lap. Positions 1-38 would be decided on time, while positions 39-43 would be based on provisionals. Four spots are awarded by the use of provisionals based on owner's points. The fifth is awarded to a past champion who has not otherwise qualified for the race. If no past champ needs the provisional, the next team in the owner points will be awarded a provisional.

Seven drivers failed to qualify: Mike Garvey, Tony Raines, Stanton Barrett, Mario Gosselin, Ryan McGlynn, Kirk Shelmerdine, and Geoff Bodine.

Full qualifying results

Race results

References 

2004 NASCAR Nextel Cup Series
NASCAR races at Phoenix Raceway
November 2004 sports events in the United States
2004 in sports in Arizona